Saint-Merd-de-Lapleau (literally Saint-Merd of Lapleau) is a commune in the Corrèze department in central France.

Population

Notable people
Antoine Jourde (1848–1923), socialist politician, born in Saint-Merd

See also
Communes of the Corrèze department

References

Communes of Corrèze